SS Faja de Oro ("Strip of Gold", which is a petroleum rich area in Mexico) was an oil tanker built in 1914. She sailed for a number of companies, and survived service in the First World War, only to be torpedoed and sunk by a German submarine during the Second World War while sailing under the Mexican flag in the Gulf of Mexico. Her sinking contributed to Mexico's decision to enter the war on the side of the Allies.

Faja de Oro was originally built by R. W. Hawthorn Leslie & Company, Hebburn-on-Tyne as the Barneson, for service with Bank Line Ltd (Andrew Weir & Co), of Glasgow. She was taken over by Andrew Weir & Co in 1915 and renamed Oyleric. She was sold in 1937 to the Italian company Ditta G.M. Barbagelata, of Genoa, and was renamed Genoano. She was seized by the Mexican government while docked at Tampico, Tamaulipas, on 8 December 1941 and renamed Faja de Oro. She was operated by Petróleos Mexicanos (Pemex), and was homeported in Tampico.

Faja de Oro was sailing unescorted from Marcus Hook, Pennsylvania, back to Tampico in May 1942 under he command of dec. Alm Gustavo Martinez Trejo. She was not carrying any cargo, and was sailing in ballast. The attack was made despite Mexican neutrality, presumably because the ship's nationality had been indiscernible in the dark. Faja de Oro was hit in the foreship by one of two torpedoes. U-106 then fired a coup de grâce at 04.33 hours, which missed. A second was fired 20 minutes later, hitting her amidships and setting her on fire. She sank shortly afterwards with the loss of 10 of her crew. 27 survivors were later rescued. The attack had been observed by another German submarine, which had also chased Faja de Oro, but on noticing U-106, had not attempted an attack.

The sinking of Faja de Oro, coming as it did a week after the sinking of the Mexican tanker  on 14 May by Reinhard Suhren's  contributed to Mexico's declaration of war on Germany on 1 June 1942.

Notes

References

1942 in Mexico
Military history of Mexico during World War II
Ships of Mexico
Shipwrecks in the Gulf of Mexico
Ships sunk by German submarines in World War II
World War II shipwrecks in the Caribbean Sea
Maritime incidents in May 1942
Ships built on the River Tyne
Oil tankers
World War I merchant ships of the United Kingdom
Tankers of the United Kingdom
World War II merchant ships of Italy
1913 ships